Dave Johannes Andreas van den Berg (born 4 February 2000) is a Dutch professional footballer who plays as a midfielder for Eerste Divisie club PEC Zwolle.

Club career

Early years
Van den Berg played youth football for his hometown club UDI '19, before joining the PSV Eindhoven youth academy in 2008.

On 3 October 2018, Van den Berg was a part of the PSV under-19 side competing in the UEFA Youth League, under head coach Ruud van Nistelrooy. He made his debut in the competition against Inter Milan's under-19s, coming on as a late substitute for Rico Zeegers in a 2–1 win. At the end of 2018, Van den Berg had a disagreement with his Van Nistelrooy, and his contract was terminated by mutual consent.

Utrecht
Van den Berg joined FC Utrecht on 13 February 2019 on a free transfer, signing a contract until 2021 with an option for an additional year. He made his debut for the reserve team Jong FC Utrecht, competing in the second-tier Eerste Divisie, on 18 October 2019 in a 2–2 home draw against De Graafschap, coming on as a substitute for Hicham Acheffay.

On 9 September 2020, his contract was extended until 2023 including an option for an additional year.

He made his Eredivisie debut for Utrecht on 29 August 2021 as a late substitute in a game against Feyenoord.

On 31 January 2022, van den Berg was loaned to Roda JC Kerkrade.

PEC Zwolle
Van den Berg joined PEC Zwolle on 4 August 2022, signing a two-year contract with an option for an additional year. He made his debut for the club on 7 August, coming off the bench for Tomislav Mrkonjić in the second half of a 2–1 league win over De Graafschap.

Career statistics

References

2000 births
Living people
Dutch footballers
Netherlands youth international footballers
Association football midfielders
PSV Eindhoven players
FC Utrecht players
Jong FC Utrecht players
Roda JC Kerkrade players
PEC Zwolle players
Eerste Divisie players
Eredivisie players
People from Uden
Footballers from North Brabant
Converts to Islam
Dutch Muslims